Ketevan (1764 – 5 July 1840) was a Georgian princess royal (batonishvili), a daughter of Heraclius II, the penultimate king of Kartli and Kakheti, and the wife of Ioann, Prince of Mukhrani. Like her sisters, Mariam and Thecla, Ketevan was a poet of some talent and wrote in the spirit of early Romanticism.

Biography
Princess Ketevan was born in 1764 in the family of Heraclius II and his third wife Darejan Dadiani. She married, c. 1781, Ioane, Prince of Mukhrani (1755–1801), a prominent military and political figure of that time. After the Georgian kingdom was annexed by the Russian Empire in 1801, Ketevan was dispossessed of a hereditary village, Karaleti, near Gori. She was suspected by the Russian commander in Georgia, Prince Pavel Tsitsianov, of being implicated in the 1804 rebellion raised by the members of the ousted royal family of Georgia. The Russian agents, further, intercepted the letters (firman) sent by Fath Ali Shah of Persia and addressed to the Georgian dignitaries, including Ketevan's son Konstantin. As a result, Tsitsianov had Ketevan briefly arrested in 1805. During her imprisonment the princess wrote a lyric, "Alas how shall I say?" (ჰოი, ვითარ ვსთქვა), which uses Romanticist imagery to represent the collapse of the Georgian monarchy: she sees "a little cloud darkening Asia's stars, lying waste happy palaces, not letting beautiful gardens boom."

Family
Ketevan had 7 children of her marriage to Ioann, Prince of Mukhrani. These were:
 Prince Konstantin (1782–7 September 1842), the last Prince of Mukhrani and lieutenant-general in the Russian service;
 Prince Teimuraz (1784–1833);
 Prince Grigol (1787–25 February 1861), major-general in the Russian service;
 Princess Barbara (1790–24 July 1843);
 Prince David (1793–22 May 1878);
 Princess Tamar (1798–1851);
 Prince Irakli (1800–c. 1816).

Burke's Peerage's version of Ketevan's second marriage to Prince Abel Andronikashvili is not accepted as credible by more recent genealogies of the Georgian royal house.

Ancestry

References

1764 births
1840 deaths
Bagrationi dynasty of the Kingdom of Kartli-Kakheti
19th-century poets from Georgia (country)
18th-century people from Georgia (country)
19th-century people from Georgia (country)
Princesses from Georgia (country)
Romantic poets
Women poets from Georgia (country)
19th-century women writers from Georgia (country)
19th-century writers from Georgia (country)